The City of Purple Dreams is a 1918 American silent drama film directed by Colin Campbell and starring Tom Santschi, Bessie Eyton, and Fritzi Brunette.

Cast
 Tom Santschi as Daniel Fitzhugh 
 Bessie Eyton as Kathlyn Otis 
 Fritzi Brunette as Esther Strom 
 Harry Lonsdale as Henry Hunt 
 Frank Clark as Symington Otis 
 Allan Sears as Olaf Nikolay 
 Lafe McKee as Pat Kelly 
 Fred Huntley as Thomas Quigg 
 William Scott as Artie Sparkle 
 Eugenie Besserer
 Cecil Holland

References

Bibliography
 Donald W. McCaffrey & Christopher P. Jacobs. Guide to the Silent Years of American Cinema. Greenwood Publishing, 1999.

External links
 

1918 films
1918 drama films
1910s English-language films
American silent feature films
Silent American drama films
American black-and-white films
Films directed by Colin Campbell
1910s American films